Mae Rim is a district (amphoe) in the central part of Chiang Mai province in northern Thailand. It is part of the Chiang Mai Urban Area, which has a population of 1.2 million people.

History
Formerly the district was called Khwaeng Mae Rim. Khwaeng Mae Rim converted to full district (amphoe) in 1914.

Geography
Neighboring districts are (from the north clockwise) Mae Taeng, San Sai, Mueang Chiang Mai, Hang Dong and Samoeng of Chiang Mai Province.

Administration
The district is divided into 11 subdistricts (tambons), which are further subdivided into 91 villages (mubans). Mae Rim is a township (thesaban tambon), which covers parts of tambons Rim Tai and Mae Sa. There are a further 10 tambon administrative organizations (TAO).

See also
 Doi Suthep–Pui National Park
 Queen Sirikit Botanic Garden

External links

amphoe.com

Mae Rim